This is a timeline documenting the events of heavy metal in the year 2018.

Bands formed
Oceanhoarse
Turilli / Lione Rhapsody

Bands disbanded
Adagio (hiatus)
Burzum
The Charm the Fury
The Color Morale (hiatus)
Darkness Divided
Devin Townsend Project (hiatus)
Dew-Scented
Diablo Blvd
Dirge Within
Ed Gein
Katatonia (hiatus)
Luca Turilli's Rhapsody
Machine Head (hiatus)
Manilla Road
Morgoth (hiatus)
Necrophagia
Rush
Sleeping Giant
Soundgarden
The Sword (hiatus)
Tengger Cavalry
Vattnet
Young and in the Way

Bands reformed
Black River
Bleed the Sky
Bleeding Through
Conception
Mötley Crüe
Static-X
Tengger Cavalry
Vomitory

Events
On January 5, Sodom announced that they had parted ways with guitarist Bernd "Bernemann" Kost and drummer Markus "Makka" Freiwald, who had been members of the band since 1996 and 2010 respectively. Later that month, bassist and vocalist Tom Angelripper announced that Sodom was rejoined by guitarist Frank "Blackfire" Gosdzik, and that Stefan "Husky" Hüskens and Yorck Segatz were revealed as the band's new drummer and second guitarist respectively.
On January 22, Slayer announced plans to embark on a farewell tour after 37 years together.
On February 12, Glenn Tipton announced that he had Parkinson's disease, with which he had been first diagnosed with a decade ago, and would no longer be touring with Judas Priest. He stated that he was still a member of the band despite his diagnosis and did not rule out future on-stage appearances. Producer and former Sabbat guitarist Andy Sneap was announced as his replacement for future tours.
On September 13, vocalist Vince Neil announced that Mötley Crüe had reunited and recorded four new songs for the film adaptation of the band's biography, The Dirt – Confessions of the World's Most Notorious Rock Band.
On September 28, lead vocalist and founding member Robb Flynn announced that Machine Head would do one final tour with longtime members Phil Demmel (guitarist) and Dave McClain (drummer), who had recently left the band. Flynn claimed that they were not breaking up but clarified that "this is the farewell tour of this lineup, this era of Machine Head. This is not the farewell tour of Machine Head."
Nightwish embarked on a nine-month world tour, titled Decades: World Tour, featuring a special set for fans, including songs that had not been played in a long time. The tour began on March 9, 2018, and an accompanying 2CD compilation called Decades was released on the same day.

Deaths
 January 3 – Josiah Boyd, former bassist of A Hill to Die Upon, died after a car accident at the age of 32.
 January 5 – Mikio Fujioka, guitarist of Babymetal, died from injuries caused by falling off an observation deck at the age of 36.
 January 9 – Paul Antignani, former drummer of Sworn Enemy, died from undisclosed reasons.
 January 10 – "Fast" Eddie Clarke, guitarist of Fastway and former guitarist of Motörhead, died of pneumonia at the age of 67.
 January 10 – Alfred Morris III, guitarist of Iron Man, died from undisclosed reasons at the age of 60.
 January 16 – Dave Holland, former drummer of Judas Priest, died from undisclosed reasons at the age of 69.
 February 1 – Marcin Walenczykowski, guitarist of Vesania and Rootwater, died from lymphoma at the age of 37.
 February 5 – Damien Percy, former drummer of Mortification, died from undisclosed reasons.
 February 7 – Pat Torpey, drummer of Mr. Big, died from Parkinson's disease at the age of 64.
 February 27 – Fabiano Penna, guitarist of Rebaelliun, died from undisclosed reasons.
 March 9 – Guillermo Calero, drummer of Wormed, died from undisclosed reasons at the age of 27.
 March 18 – Frank "Killjoy" Pucci, vocalist of Necrophagia, died from undisclosed reasons at the age of 51.
 March 28 – Caleb Scofield, bassist and vocalist of Cave In, Old Man Gloom, and Zozobra, died in car crash at age of 39.
 April 25 – Kato Khandwala, record producer, songwriter, mixer, and engineer of albums by Vimic, Pop Evil, and many other different artists, died from injuries sustained in a motorcycle accident at the age of 47.
 April 30 – Tim Calvert, former guitarist of Nevermore and Forbidden, died from amyotrophic lateral sclerosis at the age of 52.
 May 9 – Ben Graves, former drummer of Murderdolls, Dope, and Pretty Boy Floyd, died from cancer at the age of 46.
 May 29 – Josh Martin, guitarist of Anal Cunt, died from injuries sustained from falling off an escalator at the age of 45.
 June 6 – Ralph Santolla, former guitarist of Iced Earth, Deicide, Death, and Obituary, died after suffering a heart attack, falling into a coma, and being taken off life support at the age of 51.
 June 22 – Vinnie Paul, drummer of Hellyeah and former drummer of Pantera and Damageplan, died from dilated cardiomyopathy and coronary artery disease at the age of 54.
 June 25 – Jake Raymond, former vocalist of Vital Remains, died from undisclosed reasons.
 July 7 – Bret Hoffmann, former vocalist of Malevolent Creation, died from colon cancer at the age of 51.
 July 27 – Mark "The Shark" Shelton, vocalist and guitarist of Manilla Road, died from a heart attack at the age of 60.
 August 10 – Jason “J-Sin” Luttrell, former vocalist of Primer 55, died from Hepatitis C at the age of 40.
 August 14 – Randy Rampage, former vocalist of Annihilator, died from a heart attack at the age of 58.
 August 14 – Jill Janus, vocalist of Huntress, died from committing suicide at the age of 42.
 August 24 – Carlos Denogean, drummer of Weedeater, died after suffering an aneurysm at the age of 30.
 August 25 – Kyle Pavone, vocalist of We Came as Romans, died from a drug overdose at the age of 28.
 September 5 – Richard Bateman, bassist of Nasty Savage, died from a heart attack.
 October 12 – Kade Dodson, former drummer of Abated Mass of Flesh and The Tony Danza Tapdance Extravaganza, died from undisclosed reasons at the age of 33.
 October 16 – Oli Herbert, guitarist of All That Remains, died from drowning after taking antidepressants and sleeping aids at the age of 44.
 October 23 – Willy Lange, bassist of Lȧȧz Rockit and Dublin Death Patrol, died from injuries sustained in a motorcycle accident at the age of 57.
 October 27 – Todd Youth, former guitarist of Agnostic Front, Murphy's Law, Danzig, and Warzone, died from undisclosed reasons at the age of 47.
 November 29 – Erik Lindmark, vocalist and guitarist of Deeds of Flesh, died from sclerosis at the age of 46.
 December 3 – Carsten Otterbach, former guitarist of Morgoth, died from multiple sclerosis at the age of 48.
 December 7 – Lucas Starr, former bassist of Oh, Sleeper, died from colon cancer at the age of 34.

Albums released

January

February

March

April

May

June

July

August

September

October

November

December

References

2010s in heavy metal music
Metal
Culture-related timelines by year